The United States Post Office Inwood Station is a historic post office building located at 90 Vermilyea Avenue at the corner of West 204th Street in the Inwood neighborhood of Manhattan, New York City. It was built between 1935 and 1937, and designed by consulting architect Carroll H. Pratt (1874-1958) for the Office of the Supervising Architect of the United States Department of the Treasury.  It is a one-story brick building in the Colonial Revival style, with a three-bay-wide projecting entrance pavilion. It features a limestone cornice and frieze topped by a brick parapet.

The building was listed on the National Register of Historic Places in 1989.

References
Notes

External links

Inwood
Government buildings completed in 1935
Colonial Revival architecture in New York City